A Christmas Fantasy Parade is an annual parade presented at Disneyland Park in the Disneyland Resort in Anaheim, CA. The parade is a holiday parade that runs (in recent years) from mid-November until the weekend after New Year's Day. It debuted during the 1995 Holiday Season, replacing the "Very Merry Christmas Parade." The parade features several Christmas themed floats and a catchy soundtrack, along with favorite Disney characters such as Mickey, Minnie, Donald, Pluto, Goofy, Clarabelle Cow, Elsa, Anna, Olaf, Sheriff Woody, Buzz Lightyear, Belle, the Beast, Snow White and her Prince, Princess Aurora, Prince Phillip, Cinderella, Prince Charming, Ariel, Prince Eric, and the Babes in Toyland soldiers. Earlier versions of the parade included Scrooge McDuck, Roger Rabbit, Max Goof, Winnie the Pooh, Tigger, Eeyore, characters from Lilo & Stitch, The Hunchback of Notre Dame, Mulan, Aladdin, and also young children.

Units
When the parade originally debuted in 1995, it was vastly different, with all the units arranged in a different order then they are today. The original float ordering was the Opening, Santa's Mail Room, Santa's Toy Factory, A Recipe for Gingerbread Treats, Greetings from a Winter Wonderland, The Candlelight Christmas Ball, and Christmas Homecoming. Many of the floats in the original version were reused from the Very Merry Christmas Parade and the characters on the floats would vary (such as Pluto pushing Santa's Sleigh in the grand finale for many years).

The current version of the parade used since 2008  (except 2020) described here has seven units, each consisting of at least one float. The following are descriptions of each of the seven units:

Opening Unit:
A music box float, with a dancing ballerina on top of a revolving platform, and a stuffed Teddy Bear (Duffy the Disney Bear in the 2011 and 2012 versions) sits beside her.
Toy soldiers from Babes in Toyland march along the parade route playing their trumpets and snare drums.

Santa's Mail Room Unit:
Mailroom float, with Mickey and Minnie  greeting park guests, accompanied by Chip and Dale. (This float used to have Mrs. Claus on it, but she now appears alongside the dancing elves.)
Donald (Pluto until 2013; Duffy the Disney Bear in 2014) sits on the roof of the mailroom, trying to place the star on top of the Christmas tree.
4 Female Mailroom Elves and 2 Male Mailroom Elves perform with mail bags along and on top of the float.

Welcome to A Winter Wonderland Unit:
8 snowpeople scurry along, 4 male, 4 female. Four skiers swing around them. (This unit used to feature Pooh and Tigger riding on sleighs. Eeyore pulled his own sleigh. They lasted until 2016.)
A snowy Christmas Tree rolls down the parade route.
6 female skaters skate down the parade route on roller skates.
Elsa and Anna stand on top of an ice-themed float with an Olaf figure. (This float used to feature Mickey and Minnie ice skating, but they were moved to the mailroom float.)

A Recipe for Gingerbread Treats Unit:
Clarabelle Cow and 6 Gingerbread Cookies dance down the street.
6 Candy Bakers (3 Male, 3 Female) help Goofy and Pluto (Max Goof until 2013), who are on the Gingerbread float, wreak some havoc.

Candlelight Christmas Ball Unit:
Lady Tremaine, Drizella, and Anastasia (Cinderella's stepmother and stepsisters) are not invited and therefore walk in front of the unit while playing with guests.
4 Ball Dancers dance beautifully in front of the Candlelight Ball float accompanied by Snow White and her prince. 
Tiana, Prince Naveen, Cinderella, Prince Charming, Aurora, Prince Phillip, Belle, and the Beast dance on a ballroom float. 
4 Ball Dancers dance beautifully behind the Candlelight Ball float accompanied by Ariel and Prince Eric.

Santa's Toyland Unit:
Jessie and a Green Army Man ride in a hum-dinger. (Chip and Dale used to drive the hum-dinger, but they moved to the mailroom float.)
Sheriff Woody rides on a rocking horse that is on top of a Toy Block float.
 The Green Army Men (Pinocchio, Geppetto, and Jiminy Cricket until 2015) ride on top of the giant Toy Factory float making toys.
6 Toy Factory Elves dance alongside the float.
Buzz Lightyear rides in a spaceship that is on top of a Toy Block float. 
Until 2010, there used to be two Toy Block floats featuring characters from Who Framed Roger Rabbit and The Little Mermaid.

Santa's Finale Unit:
8 Finale Dancers (4 male, 4 female) dance and sing to Christmas carols in front of a moving Christmas Tree adorned with jewels.
Santa Claus sits in his sleigh on the Finale float led by his 8 Reindeer.
Two Finale Elves dance on the back of the Finale float.
Two or Three Elf Rope Carriers end the parade.

Disneyland
Christmas and holiday season parades
Walt Disney Parks and Resorts attractions